The 1979–80 Gonzaga Bulldogs men's basketball team represented Gonzaga University in the 1979–80 NCAA Division I men's basketball season. Led by second-year head coach Dan Fitzgerald, the Bulldogs were  overall  and played their home games on campus at Kennedy Pavilion and off campus at the Spokane Coliseum, both in Spokane, Washington.

This was Gonzaga's first season in the West Coast Athletic Conference (WCAC), shortened to WCC a decade later; 
its conference tournament debuted in 1987.

References

External links
Sports Reference – Gonzaga Bulldogs men's basketball – 1979–80 season

Gonzaga Bulldogs men's basketball seasons
Gonzaga
1979 in sports in Washington (state)
1980 in sports in Washington (state)